Eleanor Francis "Glo" Helin (née Francis, 19 November 1932 – 25 January 2009) was an American astronomer. She was principal investigator of the Near-Earth Asteroid Tracking (NEAT) program of NASA's Jet Propulsion Laboratory. (Some sources give her name as Eleanor Kay Helin.)

Helin was a prolific discoverer of minor planets (see list) and several comets, including periodic comets 111P/Helin–Roman–Crockett, 117P/Helin–Roman–Alu and 132P/Helin–Roman–Alu. She is credited as the discoverer of the object now known as both asteroid 4015 Wilson–Harrington and comet 107P/Wilson–Harrington. Although Wilson and Harrington preceded her by some decades, their observations did not establish an orbit for the object, while her rediscovery did. Helin discovered or co-discovered 903 asteroids and several comets.

Biography 
Helin was born an only child to Fred and Kay Francis. At the age of five, she became ill with polio, which caused her to be bed-ridden for several months.

Helin studied geology at Occidental College, leaving just shy of her graduation in 1954. she married Ron Helin and started working at California Institute of Technology, where she and Bruce C. Murray started the Lunar Research Lab to prepare for lunar landing missions.

Helin was active in planetary science and astronomy at the California Institute of Technology and the Jet Propulsion Laboratory for over three decades. Her studies of lunar craters raised interest about near Earth Objects, and in the early 1970s, she initiated the Palomar Planet-Crossing Asteroid Survey (PCAS) from Palomar Observatory. This program is responsible for the discovery of thousands of asteroids of all types including more than 200 in high inclination orbits, other asteroids in rare and unique types of orbits, 20 comets, and approximately 30 percent of the near-Earth asteroids discovered worldwide. Using the 18-inch Schmidt telescope, Helin discovered her first asteroid on July 4, 1973.

In 1980, Helin started working at JPL, where she organized and coordinated the International Near-Earth Asteroid Survey (INAS) during the 1980s, encouraging and stimulating worldwide interest in asteroids. In recognition of her accomplishments, she received NASA's Exceptional Service Medal.

After conducting the PCAS photographic search program from Palomar for nearly 25 years, Helin concentrated on the new, upgraded Near Earth Asteroid Tracking (NEAT) search program using electronic sensors on a large aperture telescope. She was the principal investigator for this program operating from JPL, for which she received the 1997 JPL Award for Excellence. She also received NASA's Group Achievement Award for the NEAT Team.

In operation from 1995 to 2007, NEAT was the first autonomous observing program; no JPL personnel were on-site, only the JPL Sunspark computer which ran the observing system through the night and transmitted the data back to JPL each morning for team member review and confirmation. NEAT detected over 26,000 objects, including 31 near-Earth asteroids, two long period comets and the unique object, 1996 PW, the most eccentric asteroid known (e = 0.99012940), which moves in a long-period (4110.50 a), comet-like orbit (semi-major axis 256.601 AU).

Helin retired from NASA in 2002, and died on January, 2009.

Caltech Optical Observatories hosted a Helin Commemorative Workshop on 28 September 2010 to honour the contributions of Eleanor and Ronald Helin. Palomar Observatory opened an exhibit dedicated to her and her work with the 18-inch Schmidt telescope in September 2013.

Awards and honors 
The Mars-crossing asteroid 3267 Glo,  discovered by Edward Bowell in 1981, was named after her nickname. The official  was published by the Minor Planet Center on 13 February 1987.

In 1991, the USS Helin debuted on the movie Star Trek VI: The Undiscovered Country. The ship was named after her for "having discovered an unprecedented number of asteroids and comets".

In 1992, Helin received an honorary doctorate from her alma mater, Occidental College.

Helin was awarded the NASA Exceptional Service Medal. In 1998 she was inducted to the Women in Technology Hall of Fame.

Discoveries by Helin 

Helin is credited by the Minor Planet Center with the discovery or co-discovered of more than 900 numbered minor planets, including the first two Aten asteroids: 2062 Aten and 2100 Ra-Shalom, which gave rise to this new orbital group of near-Earth objects.

She also discovered:
 Apollo asteroids such as 2135 Aristaeus, 3360 Syrinx, 4034 Vishnu, 4197 Morpheus, 4660 Nereus, 4769 Castalia and 6489 Golevka, among others,
 Amor asteroids such as 3757 Anagolay, 3988 Huma, 4055 Magellan, 4957 Brucemurray, 5653 Camarillo, 7336 Saunders and 8013 Gordonmoore,
 three Jupiter trojans including 3240 Laocoon,
 Mars-crossers such as 9969 Braille,
 hundreds of main-belt asteroids such as 4897 Tomhamilton,

Comets discovered by Helin include:
 111P/Helin–Roman–Crockett
 117P/Helin–Roman–Alu
 132P/Helin–Roman–Alu
 151P/Helin
 152P/Helin–Lawrence
 The asteroid / Periodic comet 4015 Wilson–Harrington

List of discovered minor planets

See also

References

External links 
 Interview with Eleanor Helin, Web of Stories

1932 births
2009 deaths
20th-century American astronomers
21st-century American astronomers
20th-century American women scientists
American women astronomers
Discoverers of asteroids
Discoverers of comets

Near-Earth Asteroid Tracking
Scientists from California
21st-century American women scientists